Lynn Venable is a retired American soccer goalkeeper who played professionally in the American Indoor Soccer Association, Major Indoor Soccer League, USISL and Continental Indoor Soccer League.

Venable graduated from Lloyd V. Berkner High School in Richardson, Texas.  He attended North Texas State where he played on the men’s soccer team from 1980 to 1983.  In 1984, he Venable played for the Dallas Mean Green as they won the National Amateur Cup.  On January 5, 1990, he signed with the Indiana Kick of the American Indoor Soccer Association.  In the fall of 1990, he signed with the Dallas Sidekicks of the Major Indoor Soccer League.  The Sidekicks released him at the end of the season.  In 1991, he joined the Dallas Rockets of the USISL where he played for two seasons.  In 1997, he played for the Arizona Sandsharks of the Continental Indoor Soccer League.

References

External links
 MISL stats
 Dallas Sidekicks: Lynn Venable

Living people
1962 births
American soccer players
American Indoor Soccer Association players
Arizona Sandsharks players
Continental Indoor Soccer League players
Dallas Rockets players
Dallas Sidekicks (original MISL) players
Major Indoor Soccer League (1978–1992) players
North Texas Mean Green men's soccer players
USISL players
Association football goalkeepers